Fagaramide is a naturally occurring compound found in various species of Zanthoxylum plants. It, and analogs based on its skeleton, have been investigated for various biological effects. The relatively simple structure and ease of synthesis have allowed production of libraries of related compounds.

References 

Benzodioxoles
Carboxamides